Lykens can refer to:

Places
United States
 Lykens, Ohio
 Lykens Township, Crawford County, Ohio
 The borough of Lykens, Pennsylvania
 Lykens Township, Pennsylvania
 Lykens, Wisconsin